Allen Lowell Shields (May 7, 1927 – September 16, 1989) was an American mathematician who worked on measure theory, complex analysis, functional analysis and operator theory, and was "one of the world's leading authorities on spaces of analytic functions."

Shields was a student of Witold Hurewicz.

A special issue of The Mathematical Intelligencer, for which he served as editor of the "Years Ago" column, was dedicated to his memory in 1990.

Notable students 
Shields directed a large number of doctoral dissertations, including the 1967 PhD thesis of Theodore Kaczynski titled "Boundary Functions".

References

20th-century American mathematicians
1927 births
1989 deaths
University of Michigan faculty